Big in Japan were a punk band that emerged from Liverpool, England in the late 1970s. They are better known for the later successes of their band members than for their own music.

History
Big in Japan began from the same Merseyside scene which would produce Echo & the Bunnymen, The Teardrop Explodes, OMD, and Dalek I Love You.

Big In Japan started off playing gigs around Liverpool, such as Ruffwood School in Kirkby along with Wah! Heat, but most notably at Eric's Club. Their stage show was unique: lead singer Jayne Casey would perform with a lampshade over her shaved head, guitarist Bill Drummond played in a kilt and bassist Holly Johnson performed in a flamboyant manner which he would later take further in Frankie Goes to Hollywood.

As an initial idea of Deaf School's Clive Langer, his friend Bill Drummond (guitar, vocals), Kevin Ward (bass, vocals) and Phil Allen (drums), formed the band in May 1977, playing only three gigs, the first of them at Bretton Hall College, in Yorkshire. In August, the line-up grew, joining Jayne Casey (vocals), Ian Broudie (guitar) and Clive Langer (guitar), who quit in September, but not before the band recorded their first song released, "Big In Japan", which appeared in the 7" single compilation Brutality Religion and a dance beat, released the same year. In October, Ambrose Reynolds joined to replace Ward who then left that December, but Reynolds himself quit shortly afterwards and was replaced by Holly Johnson. In January 1978, Budgie (previously in The Spitfire Boys and later member of The Slits and Siouxsie and the Banshees) replaced Allen on drums, and in early June, Johnson was sacked and replaced with ex-Deaf School Steve Lindsey, who was replaced in July by Dave Balfe (previously in Dalek I Love You), the last member to join.

Hatred of the band reached such a level that a petition calling on them to split up was launched by a jealous young Julian Cope resulting from a rivalry with the Crucial Three. Displayed in local shop Probe Records the petition gathered numerous signatures, including those of the band themselves.  According to Cope's autobiography, "Of course, Bill Drummond was into the whole thing and told us we needed 14,000 signatures, then they'd split up.  We got about nine". In the 1980s, Drummond became manager of Cope's band, The Teardrop Explodes.

The band broke up after a last gig at Eric's on 26 August 1978. During their time, Big in Japan recorded four songs which were included in From Y to Z and Never Again EP, released afterwards to pay off debts. The unintentional consequence of the EP was the formation of the Zoo label, which went on to release early material by Echo & the Bunnymen and The Teardrop Explodes, amongst others. They also recorded a Peel Session on 12 February 1979, with a line-up of Casey, Broudie, Johnson and Budgie; the session was broadcast on 6 March 1979. Balfe and Drummond then formed the short-lived Lori and the Chameleons.

Big in Japan left a recorded legacy of seven songs: one on a single, four on their EP From Y to Z and Never Again, and two released on compilation albums. As of 2005, five out of these recorded songs are commercially available, on the compilation album, The Zoo: Uncaged 1978-1982.

Ironically, the band never performed or released any disc in Japan.

According to the Liverpool Echo, Big in Japan were "a supergroup with a difference - its members only became super after they left"; former members of Big in Japan would later find fame in The KLF, Frankie Goes To Hollywood, The Lightning Seeds and Siouxsie & The Banshees.

The German group Alphaville's first single was called "Big in Japan", named directly after the band. Coincidentally, Frankie Goes to Hollywood's single "Relax" was displaced from the top of the German charts by Alphaville's "Big in Japan". Singer/songwriter Gold later said that "we never got to speak with him [Holly Johnson] but he must have wondered 'who is this German group with a song named after my band?'!"

Members' remembrances
Jayne Casey later states:

Ian Broudie said:

Bill Drummond recalled:

Discography

Singles and EPs
 "Brutality, Religion and a Dance Beat" (Eric's, September 1977) - split with Chuddie Nuddies
 From Y to Z and Never Again (Zoo, 1978)

Compilations
 Street to Street: A Liverpool Album (1978) - Match of the Day
 To the Shores of Lake Placid (1982) - Suicide a Go Go / Society for Cutting Up Men
 The Zoo: Uncaged 1978-1982 (1990) - Nothing Special / Cindy & the Valley of the Barbie Dolls / Suicide a Go Go / Taxi / Society for Cutting Up Men

Other work
Three unreleased songs were recorded for the band's only John Peel session of 6 March 1979; "Suicide High Life", "Goodbye" and "Don't Bomb China".

A bootleg CD is in circulation which contains all of the material listed above as well as demo versions of "Society for Cutting Up Men" (named after the manifesto Society for Cutting Up Men), "Boys Cry", "Big in Japan", "Space Walk" and "Match of the Day" and "Taxi". It also contains the audio from the band's performance of "Suicide A Go Go" on their Granada TV appearance of 23 March 1978 (on Tony Wilson's, So It Goes).

Black-and-white, amateur home movie footage of the band performing live at Eric's still exists - excerpts of the band performing both "Big In Japan" and "Cindy and the Barbi Dolls" were used in the BBC Television's Rock Family Trees: The New Merseybeat, originally broadcast in August 1995 and repeated in 1997.

Band members
 Bill Drummond – guitar, vocals (1977–1978)
 Kev Ward – bass, vocals (1977)
 Phil Allen – drums (1977)
 Jayne Casey – vocals (1977–1978, 1979)
 Ian Broudie – guitar (1977–1978, 1979)
 Clive Langer – guitar (1977)
 Ambrose Reynolds – bass (1977)
 Holly Johnson – bass, vocals (1977–1978, 1979)
 Budgie – drums (1978, 1979)
 Steve Lindsey – bass (1978)
 David Balfe – bass (1978)

References

 
English punk rock groups
English post-punk music groups
Musical groups from Liverpool
Bill Drummond
Zoo Records artists
Scouse culture of the early 1980s
Musical groups established in 1977
Musical groups disestablished in 1978